Najdi is a surname. Notable people with the surname include:

Bijan Najdi (1941–1997), Iranian writer
Bilal Najdi (born 1993), Lebanese footballer
Mahmoud Najdi (born 1989), Lebanese footballer
Omar Najdi (born 1986), Moroccan footballer

Arabic-language surnames